David Hunt (born 5 March 1980) is an English former footballer who played as a full back in the Football League for Darlington and in non-league football for Durham City.

Hunt was born in Durham. He made his Darlington debut as a 16-year-old, on 22 February 1997, as a very late substitute in a 3–2 defeat away to Exeter City in Division Three, and remained with the club for a further three years without playing for the first team again. He spent the 2000–01 season with Northern League club Durham City, but his time there was disrupted by injury.

References

1980 births
Living people
Sportspeople from Durham, England
Footballers from County Durham
English footballers
Association football defenders
Darlington F.C. players
Durham City A.F.C. players
English Football League players
Northern Football League players